Mikołaj Stefan Pac (c. 1626 – 1684) was a Polish nobleman, voivode of Troki since 1651, castellan of Wilno since 1670 and the bishop of Wilno since 1671.

Bibliography 
Pacowie: materyjały historyczno-genealogiczne / ułożone i wydane przez Józefa Wolffa, 1885, s. 172-188
A. Rachuba, Mikołaj Stefan Pac [w:] Polski Słownik Biograficzny, t. XXIV, 1979, s. 738-741.

External links 
Biskup Mikołaj Stefan Pac

1626 births
1684 deaths
Mikolaj Stefan
Polish nobility
Bishops of Vilnius
Ecclesiastical senators of the Polish–Lithuanian Commonwealth
Voivodes of Trakai
17th-century Roman Catholic bishops in the Polish–Lithuanian Commonwealth